Alcalá-Galiano is a surname shared by several notable people:

Paternal usage
 Dionisio Alcalá Galiano (1760–1805), Spanish naval officer, cartographer, and explorer

Maternal usage
 Juan Valera y Alcalá-Galiano (1824–1905), Spanish realist author, writer and political figure

Compound surnames
Spanish-language surnames